South Cambridgeshire District Council was created as part of the 1972 local government reforms. The first elections to the new authority were held in the year 1973. From 1978 until 2016, one third of the council were elected each year, followed by one year without a poll. Since 2018, all members of the council are elected at once in a so-called 'all-out' election, after a decision made in 2015.

Political control

Leadership
The leaders of the council since 2001 have been:

Council elections

Notes:

District result maps

By-election results
The following is an incomplete list of by-elections to South Cambridgeshire District Council.

1998-2002

2002-2006

2006-2010

2010-2014

2014-2018

2018-2022

2022-2026

References

External links
 South Cambridgeshire District Council

 
Council elections in Cambridgeshire
South Cambridgeshire District
District council elections in England